Johann Nikolaus Harnoncourt or historically Johann Nikolaus Graf de la Fontaine und d'Harnoncourt-Unverzagt; (6 December 1929 – 5 March 2016) was an Austrian conductor, particularly known for his historically informed performances of music from the Classical era and earlier. Starting out as a classical cellist, he founded his own period instrument ensemble, Concentus Musicus Wien, in 1953, and became a pioneer of the Early Music movement. Around 1970, Harnoncourt began conducting opera and concert performances, soon leading international symphony orchestras, and appearing at leading concert halls, operatic venues and festivals. His repertoire then widened to include composers of the 19th and 20th centuries. In 2001 and 2003, he conducted the Vienna New Year's Concert. Harnoncourt was also the author of several books, mostly on subjects of performance history and musical aesthetics.

Early life 

Johann Nikolaus Harnoncourt was born as an Austrian citizen in Berlin, Germany, in 1929. His Austrian mother, Ladislaja née Gräfin von Meran, Freiin von Brandhoven, was the great-granddaughter of the Habsburg Archduke Johann, the 13th child of Emperor Leopold II, making him a descendant of Holy Roman Emperors and other European royalty. His father, Eberhard Harnoncourt, born de la Fontaine Graf d'Harnoncourt-Unverzagt, was an Austrian engineer working in Berlin who had two children from a previous marriage. Two years after Nikolaus's birth, his brother Philipp was born. The family eventually moved to Graz, Austria, where Eberhard had obtained a post in the state government (Landesregierung) of Styria.

Harnoncourt was raised in Graz, and studied music in Vienna. During his youth, he served in the Hitler Youth under duress, where, as he noted:

At the Vienna Music Academy, Harnoncourt studied cello with Paul Grümmer and Emanuel Brabec, and also learned viola da gamba.

Career 

Harnoncourt was a cellist with the Vienna Symphony from 1952 to 1969. In 1953, he founded the period-instrument ensemble Concentus Musicus Wien with his wife, Alice Hoffelner, whom he married during the year. The Concentus Musicus Wien was dedicated to performances on period instruments. He played the viola da gamba at this time, as well as the cello. For the Telefunken (later Teldec) label, Harnoncourt recorded Baroque repertoire, beginning with the viol music of Henry Purcell, and extending to include works like Bach's The Musical Offering, Monteverdi's L'incoronazione di Poppea, and Rameau's Castor et Pollux. One of his final recordings with the Concentus Musicus Wien was of Beethoven's Symphonies Nos. 4 and 5.

One reason that Harnoncourt left the Vienna Symphony was to become a conductor. He made his conducting debut at La Scala, Milan, in 1970, leading a production of Monteverdi's Il ritorno d'Ulisse in patria.

In 1971, Harnoncourt established a joint project with conductor Gustav Leonhardt to record all of J.S. Bach's cantatas. The Teldec Bach cantata project was eventually completed in 1990 and was the only cantata cycle to use an all-male choir and soloist roster, with the exception of cantatas nos. 51 and 199, which were intended for a female soprano voice. He also made the first recordings in historically informed performance of Bach's Mass in B minor (1968) and St Matthew Passion (1970). In 2001, an acclaimed and Grammy Award winning recording of the St Matthew Passion with the Arnold Schoenberg Choir was released, which included the entire score of the piece in Bach's own hand on a CD-ROM. This was his third recording of the work.

Harnoncourt later performed with many orchestras performing on modern instruments, but retaining considerations for historical authenticity in terms of tempi and dynamics, among other issues. He also expanded his repertoire, continuing to play the baroque works, but also championing the Viennese operetta repertoire. He made a benchmark recording of Beethoven's symphonies with the Chamber Orchestra of Europe (COE), and recorded Beethoven's piano concertos with Pierre-Laurent Aimard and the COE.

Harnoncourt was a guest conductor of the Vienna Philharmonic and made several recordings with the orchestra. Between 1987 and 1991, he conducted four new productions of Mozart operas at the Vienna State Opera (1987–91: Idomeneo; 1988–90: Die Zauberflöte; 1989: Die Entführung aus dem Serail; 1989–91: Così fan tutte). He directed the Vienna Philharmonic's New Year's Day concerts in 2001 and 2003.

In 1992, Harnoncourt debuted at the Salzburg Festival conducting a concert with the Chamber Orchestra of Europe. In the following years, he led several concerts with the Chamber Orchestra of Europe, the Vienna Philharmonic and the Concentus Musicus. Harnoncourt also served as the conductor for major opera productions of the Festival: L'incoronazione di Poppea (1993), Mozart's Le nozze di Figaro (1995 and 2006), Don Giovanni (2002, marking also Anna Netrebko's international breakthrough as Donna Anna, and 2003) and La clemenza di Tito (2003 and 2006), and Purcell's King Arthur (2004). In 2012, Harnoncourt conducted a new production of Die Zauberflöte staged by Jens-Daniel Herzog.

Harnoncourt made his guest-conducting debut with the Concertgebouw Orchestra, Amsterdam in 1975. He continued as a guest conductor with the orchestra, including in several opera productions and recordings. In October 2000, the Royal Concertgebouw Orchestra (KCO) named him their Honorair gastdirigent (Honorary Guest Conductor). His final appearance with the KCO was in October 2013, leading Bruckner's Symphony No. 5.

Other recordings outside of the baroque and classical era repertoire included his 2002 recording of Bruckner's Symphony No. 9 with the Vienna Philharmonic. An accompanying second CD contained a lecture by Harnoncourt about the symphony with musical examples, including the rarely heard fragments from the unfinished finale. In 2009, Harnoncourt recorded Gershwin's Porgy and Bess, taken from live performances at Graz. He was a conductor for the Rudolf Buchbinder's recording of Wolfgang Amadeus Mozart's Piano concertos No. 23 & 25.

On 5 December 2015, one day before his 86th birthday, Harnoncourt announced his retirement via his website. "My bodily strength requires me to cancel my future plans," he wrote in a hand-written letter inserted into the program on his 86th birthday of a concert by the Concentus Musicus Wien.

Styriarte 

Harnoncourt was the focus of the annual festival of classical music Styriarte, founded in 1985 to tie him closer to his hometown, Graz. He programmed the festival for 31 years. Events have been held at different venues in Graz and in the surrounding region.

Personal life 

Harnoncourt met his wife Alice through their mutual interest in historically informed performances of Baroque music and co-founded the Concentus Musicus Wien. Their daughter is the mezzo-soprano Elisabeth von Magnus.  Their two surviving sons are Philipp and Franz. Their third son Eberhard, a violin maker, died in 1990 in an automobile accident.

Harnoncourt died on 5 March 2016 in the village of Sankt Georgen im Attergau, north east of Salzburg.  His widow Alice, their three adult children, seven grandchildren, and three great-grandchildren survived him. Alice died in July 2022.

Awards 

 Erasmus Prize (Praemium Erasmianum Foundation, Netherlands, 1980)
 Joseph Marx Music Prize of the Province of Styria (1982)
 Austrian Cross of Honour for Science and Art, 1st class (1987)
 Honorary Membership of the Society of Music Friends in Vienna (1992)
 Léonie Sonning Music Prize (Denmark, 1993)
 Polar Music Prize (Sweden, 1994)
 Honorary Membership of the University of the Arts Graz (1995)
 Hanseatic Goethe Prize (1995)
 Robert Schumann Prize of the City of Zwickau (1997)
 Hans von Bülow Medal (Berlin, 1999)
 Honorary Guest Conductor of the Royal Concertgebouw Orchestra (Amsterdam, 2000)
 Grammy Award (2001)
 Ernst von Siemens Music Prize (Bavarian Academy of Fine Arts, 2002)
 Bremen Music Festival Prize (2002)
 Georg Philipp Telemann Prize (Magdeburg, 2004)
 Kyoto Prize for Lifetime Achievement (Japan, 2005)
 Grand Gold Decoration with Star of Styria (2005)
 Bach Medal (Leipzig, 2007)
 Austrian Decoration for Science and Art (2008)
 Honorary doctor (Mozarteum University Salzburg, 2008)
 Honorary Citizenship of Sankt Georgen im Attergau (2009)
 Gramophone Lifetime Achievement Award (London, 2009)
 Royal Philharmonic Society Gold Medal (2010)
 Honorary Doctorate from the University of Music and Dance Cologne (2011)
 Gold Medal for services to the city of Vienna (2011) (together with Alice Harnoncourt)
 Romano Guardini Prize (2012)
 Voted into the Gramophone Hall of Fame (London, 2012)

Harnoncourt was a member of the Royal Swedish Academy of Music and of the Order Pour le Mérite for Science and Art, and an Honorary Doctor of the University of Edinburgh.

Recordings 

 Nikolaus Harnoncourt, Frans Brüggen, Leopold Stastny, Herbert Tachezi. Johann Sebastian Bach: Gamba Sonatas — Trio Sonata in G major. Viola da gamba: Jacobus Stainer; Cello: Andrea Castagneri; Flute: A.Grenser; Harpsichord: a copy after Italian builders by Martin Skowroneck. Label: Telefunken.
 Nikolaus Harnoncourt, Gustav Leonhardt, Leonhardt-Consort (Orchestra), Concentus musicus Wien (Orchestra), Alan Curtis, Anneke Ulttenbosch, Herbert Tachezi. Johann Sebastian Bach: Harpsichord Concertos BWV 1052, 1057, 1064. Violin, continuo, harpsichord. Label: Teldec
 Nikolaus Harnoncourt, Chamber Orchestra of Europe. Franz Schubert. Symphonies. Label: Ica Classics.
 Nikolaus Harnoncourt, Rudolf Buchbinder (fortepiano). Wolfgang Amadeus Mozart. Piano concertos No. 23&25  Played on a Walter fortepiano replica by Paul McNulty. Label: Sony.
 Nikolaus Harnoncourt, Chamber Orchestra of Europe, Pierre-Laurent Aimard (piano). Ludwig van Beethoven. Piano Concertos Nos. 1–5. Label: Teldec Classics.
 Nikolaus Harnoncourt, Chamber Orchestra of Europe, Gidon Kremer (violin), Martha Argerich (piano). Schumann: Piano Concerto and Violin Concerto. Label: Teldec Classics

Bibliography

Notes

References

Sources 

 Gratzer, Wolfgang (ed.) (2009). Ereignis Klangrede. Nikolaus Harnoncourt als Dirigent und Musikdenker (klang-reden 3), Freiburg/Br.: Rombach. 
 Official catalogue Nikolaus Harnoncourt. Die Universität Mozarteum Salzburg ehrt den Dirigenten und Musikdenker. Salzburg: Universität Mozarteum 2008

External links 

 
 
 
 November 2000 Interview with Norman Lebrecht
 Royal Concertgebouw Orchestra page on Nikolaus Harnoncourt
 Warner Classics page on Nikolaus Harnoncourt
 John Rockwell: Recordings; Harnoncourt's Mozart shows steady growth The New York Times, 1 April 1990
 Hein Bruns: Descendants of Archduke Johann of Austria, heinbruins.nl
 Memorial service notice for Nikolaus Harnoncourt, 18 March 2016 (Graz) and 19 March 2016 (Vienna)

1929 births
2016 deaths
Musicians from Berlin
Austrian choral conductors
Austrian classical cellists
Male conductors (music)
Bach conductors
Bach musicians
Counts of Austria
Grammy Award winners
Honorary Members of the Royal Academy of Music
Kyoto laureates in Arts and Philosophy
Members of the Royal Swedish Academy of Music
Members of the Society of Friends of Music in Vienna
Musicians from Vienna
Austrian performers of early music
Recipients of the Austrian Decoration for Science and Art
Recipients of the Pour le Mérite (civil class)
Royal Philharmonic Society Gold Medallists
University of Music and Performing Arts Vienna alumni
Viol players
20th-century Austrian conductors (music)
20th-century Austrian male musicians
21st-century Austrian conductors (music)
21st-century male musicians
Ernst von Siemens Music Prize winners
Erato Records artists
Harnoncourt family